Nathaniel Bassey  is a Nigerian singer, pastor, trumpeter and gospel songwriter popularly known for his songs "Imela", "Onise Iyanu" and "Olowogbogboro." He attends The Redeemed Christian Church Of God and pastors The Oasis Lagos, The Youth Church of the RCCG Kings Court in VI, Lagos.

Early life and education 
Bassey was born in Lagos, Nigeria in 1981. He is from Ikot Ofon Ikono, Uyo local government area in Akwa-Ibom state, South-South Nigeria. His father, Mr E Joshua Bassey, was a minister in The Apostolic Church Bashua Assembly. He studied international relations and politics at the University of Lagos before moving to London to study politics thereafter. Conversely, he studied music at Middlesex University Summer School.

Music career 
Nathaniel started his musical career in the church where he then joined the Rhodes Orchestra and played the trumpet for two years. He was just an ordinary trumpeter until he composed a song at the visit to Stella Obasanjo, the late wife of former president Olusegun Obasanjo. In 2018, Bassey was one of the leading artistes in the Nigerian Christian gathering - The Experience. His debut album Elohim was recorded and mixed in Cape Town, South Africa in the year 2008. It has been described as a spiritual and artistic masterpiece with the hit track, "someone's knocking at the door," a soft-rock tune currently generating so much interest locally and internationally.

 Nathaniel started the #HallelujahChallenge in June 2017, where he and other believers worship God for an hour, from 12:00 am to 1:00 am. He streams this event on his Instagram page and invites others to join him. In less than a month, the event had over 600,000 views. The #HallelujahChallenge for 2020 was held from 4 to 24 February. In 2021, the challenge held from 1 to 21 February.

Studio albums 

 Someone's at the Door (2010)
The Son of God (& Imela) (2014)
This God is too Good (2016)
Revival Flames (2017)
Jesus: The Resurrection & the Life (2018)
The King is Coming (2019)
Hallelujah Again (Revelation 19:3) (2021)
Names of God (2022)
See what the Lord has done (2022)
Yeshua Hamashiach (2019)
You are God (2016)
Wonderful wonder (2016)

Performances

References

Living people
Nigerian gospel singers
University of Lagos alumni
Singers from Lagos
21st-century Nigerian male singers
Nigerian trumpeters
Year of birth missing (living people)